Dashitou railway station is a fourth-class railway station in Dashitou, Dunhua, Yanbian, Jilin, China on the Changchun–Tumen railway. It was opened in 1932.

See also
Dashitou South railway station

References 

Railway stations in Yanbian
Railway stations in Jilin
Railway stations in China opened in 1932